Crassispira pseudocarbonaria is a species of sea snail, a marine gastropod mollusc in the family Pseudomelatomidae, .

Description
The length of the shell attains 26 mm.

Distribution
This marine species occurs in the Gulf of Guinea, West Africa.

References

 Nolf, F., 2009. - Crassispira pseudocarbonaria: a new turrid from the Gulf of Guinea. Neptunea 8(1): 1-18

pseudocarbonaria
Gastropods described in 2009